"Pay to Cum" (titled "Pay to Cum!" on the record cover) is the debut single by Washington, D.C.-based hardcore punk band Bad Brains. It was released in June 1980 on Bad Brain Records. The single was recorded in New York City by Jimi Quidd at his Dots Studios.

The A-side to the original single was "Pay to Cum", while the flipside was "Stay Close to Me", identified as Side 1. The original 7" had no B-side or Side 2.

Reception
Trouser Press called it a "memorable ... 1:33 of free-fire guitar rage" that established Bad Brains' "mastery" of hardcore punk.

In 2007, Filter magazine called it "one of the fastest, most furious songs ever recorded".

In popular culture
The song was featured in the 1985 film After Hours, directed by Martin Scorsese. It was later featured during the opening credits of the 2006 documentary American Hardcore.

Personnel
 H.R. – lead vocals
 Earl Hudson – drums
 Darryl Jenifer – bass
 Dr. Know – guitar

Production
 Jimi Quidd – producer
 Steve Horton, Reese Virgin – engineers, mixing
 Leigh Sioris – assistant engineer
 Bob Ludwig – mastering
 Charles Davis – front cover photo
 Paul Bishow – photography

References

1980 debut singles
1980 songs
Bad Brains songs
Songs written by Dr. Know (guitarist)
Songs written by Darryl Jenifer
Songs written by H.R.
Songs written by Earl Hudson